The Ixian Grand Aegean Tennis Cup is a professional tennis tournament played on outdoor hard courts. It is currently part of the ATP Challenger Tour. It is held annually at the Rhodes Tennis Club in Rhodes, Greece, since 2009.

Past finals

Singles

Doubles

Singles seeds & wild cards 2010, 2009

Seeds 2010

Rankings are as of April 19, 2010.

Other entrants
The following players received wildcards into the singles main draw:
  Paris Gemouchidis
  Alexandros Jakupovic
  Theodoros Angelinos
  Konstantinos Economidis

The following players received entry from the qualifying draw:
  Denis Gremelmayr
  Mikhail Ledovskikh
  Andis Juška
  Andrej Martin

Seeds 2009

 Rankings are as of April 20, 2009.

Other entrants
The following players received wildcards into the singles main draw:
  Theodoros Angelinos
  Grigor Dimitrov
  Alexandros-Ferdinandos Georgoudas
  Henri Kontinen

The following players received entry from the qualifying draw:
  Rohan Bopanna
  Pierre-Ludovic Duclos
  Michael Kohlmann
  Noam Okun

Top Greek players

External links
Official website
ITF search 

ATP Challenger Tour
Tretorn SERIE+ tournaments
Hard court tennis tournaments
Tennis tournaments in Greece
Sport in Rhodes
Events in Rhodes